Fornovo railway station (Stazione di Fornovo) is a station that serves the Italian town of Fornovo di Taro. It is located on the Parma–La Spezia railway and the Fidenza–Fornovo railway.

Buildings and infrastructure 
The station has three tracks for passenger trains (tracks 1, 3 and 4) served by a platform and connected by an overpass and many other tracks for prolonged stops of freight trains, between 255 and 430 m in length. Trains can continue to Parma (direction indicator "2", single track) or to Fidenza (direction indicator "1", single track). The blocking system is of the automatic block type (with fixed currents) both towards Parma and towards Fidenza, while an "electric axle counter" system is used for trains bound for S. Stefano di Magra (Fornovo–Berceto section).

Rail services
As of 2007, the station was used  by 1000 people each day.

Services 
The station, which RFI manages and classified in 2008 in the silver category, has:
  ticket machines
  waiting room
  toilets
  bar
  railway police station.

Interchanges 
  taxi rank
  bus stop (TEP).

References

Railway stations in Emilia-Romagna
Railway stations opened in 1883